Krzysztof Antoni Szembek was born on 25 March 1667 in the village of Szczepanowo and died on 6 July 1748 in Łowicz. He was the Bishop of Livonia from 1711, the Bishop of Poznań from 1717 to 1719, the Kujawy Bishop from 1719 to 1739, the Archbishop of Gniezno and Primate of Poland from 1739, a clerical referendary in 1709, a Pomeranian archdeacon, the canon of Włocławek and the canon of Przemyśl in 1699.

References

External links
 Virtual tour of Gniezno Cathedral 
 List of Primates of Poland 

1667 births
1748 deaths
Archbishops of Gniezno
People from Mogilno County
Bishops of Poznań
Bishops of Kujawy and Włocławek
Canons of Włocławek